Rebecca Sultana is a Bangladeshi former government official who will become the 9th First Lady of Bangladesh as the wife of newly elected President Shahabuddin Chuppu. She will serve as the First Lady of Bangladesh from 24 April 2023.

Career
Rebecca Sultana joined BCS administration cadre as Assistant Commissioner and retired in 2009 as Joint Secretary. She is currently a professor in the Department of Human Resources Program at Primeasia University and is serving as the Founder Chairman of Friends for Children Organization.

Personal life
On 16 November 1972, Rebecca Sultana married Shahabuddin Chuppu. They have one child, whose name is Md. Arshad Adnan (Roni).

References

People from Pabna District
First Ladies of Bangladesh
Living people